Nir Avraham Sivilia (born 26 May 1975) is a former Israeli footballer.

Honours
Maccabi Tel Aviv
Israeli Premier League: 1994-95
Israel State Cup: 1993-94
Toto Cup: 1992-93
Beitar Jerusalem
Israeli Premier League: 1996–97, 1997–98
Toto Cup: 1997-98
Maccabi Haifa
Israeli Premier League: 2001–02

External links
Nir Sivilia at One
Nir Sivilia at Bnei Yehuda's official website
Nir Sivilia at Maccabi Haifa's official website

1975 births
Living people
Israeli Jews
Israeli footballers
Israel international footballers
Maccabi Tel Aviv F.C. players
Maccabi Haifa F.C. players
Beitar Jerusalem F.C. players
Hapoel Haifa F.C. players
Bnei Yehuda Tel Aviv F.C. players
Footballers from Tel Aviv
Liga Leumit players
Israeli Premier League players
Israeli people of Bulgarian-Jewish descent
Israeli people of Spanish-Jewish descent
Association football forwards